This is a list of B-side collections. It does not include remix albums.

 Adam Ant – B-Side Babies (1994)
 Alanis Morissette – Feast on Scraps (2004)
 Avril Lavigne – B-Sides (2001)
 Alkaline Trio – Alkaline Trio (2000)
 Alkaline Trio – Remains (2007)
 Anberlin – Lost Songs (2007)
 Anthrax – Attack of the Killer B's (1991)
 The Aquabats – Myths, Legends, and Other Amazing Adventures, Vol. 2 (2000)
 Ash – Cosmic Debris (2002)
 Avenged Sevenfold – Diamonds in the Rough  (2008)
 Beck – Stray Blues (2000)
 Bee Gees – Rarities (1989)
 Biffy Clyro – Lonely Revolutions (Limited copies released exclusively on the band's website) (2010)
 Big Country – Restless Natives & Rarities (1998), the other seven "Rarities" discs.
 Blur – The Special Collectors Edition (1994), Never released outside Japan.
 Bon Jovi – 100,000,000 Bon Jovi Fans Can't Be Wrong (2004)
 Bouncing Souls – The Bad the Worse and the Out of Print (2002)
 Broken Social Scene – Bee Hives (2003)
 The Cardigans – The Other Side of the Moon (1997)
 Carly Rae Jepsen – Dedicated Side B  (2020)
 Carly Rae Jepsen – Emotion: Side B (2016)
 The Charlatans – Songs From The Other Side (2002)
The Chemical Brothers – B-Sides Volume 1 (2007)
 The Clash – Black Market Clash (1993)
 Cliff Richard – Rare 'B' Sides 1963–1989 (2009)
 Cartel Manuel – Manuelito (2022)
 Coldplay – A Rush of B-Sides To Your Head, Castles (both are actually widespread bootlegs, not official albums)
 Crowded House – Afterglow (1999)
 The Cure – Join the Dots: B-Sides & Rarities, 1978–2001 [Box set] (2004)
 Damien Rice – B-Sides (2004)
 Death From Above 1979 – Romance Bloody Romance: Remixes & B-Sides (2005)
 Def Leppard – Retro Active (1993)
 Deftones – B-Sides & Rarities (2005)
 Del Amitri – Lousy With Love
 Depeche Mode – B-Sides & Instrumentals (a widespread bootleg from 1999)
 D'espairsRay –  Antique  (2011)
 Die Ärzte - Bäst of (2006)
 Disturbed – The Lost Children (2011)
 Do As Infinity – Do the B-Side (2004)
 Doves – Lost Sides (2003)
 Dropkick Murphys – The Singles Collection, Volume 1 (2000)
 Dropkick Murphys – Singles Collection, Volume 2 (2005)
 Eels – B-Sides & Rarities 1996–2003 (2005) (an iTunes Music Store Collection)
 Eels – Useless Trinkets: B-Sides, Soundtracks, Rarities and Unreleased 1996–2006 (2008)
 Elastic No-No Band – No-No's (Leftovers and Live Songs)
 Elbow – Dead In The Boot
 Emilie Autumn – A Bit o' This & That (2007)
 Embrace – Dry Kids: B-Sides 1997–2005 (2005)
 The Fall – 458489 B-sides (1990)
 Feeder – Picture Of Perfect Youth (2004)
 Five Iron Frenzy – Cheeses...(of Nazareth) (2003)
 Florence + the Machine – The B-Sides
 Foo Fighters – Five Songs And A Cover (2005)
 Fountains of Wayne – Out of State Plates (2005)
 Frankenstein Drag Queens From Planet 13 – Rare Treats (unofficial)
 Genesis –  Genesis Archive 1 (1998) 
 Genesis – Genesis Archive 2 (2000)
 Gorillaz – D-Sides (2007)
 Gorillaz – G-Sides (2001)
 Green Day – Shenanigans (2002)
 Hitomi – HTM ~TIARTROP FLES~ (2003)
 Hole – My Body, The Hand Grenade (1997)
 Ice Cube – Bootlegs & B-Sides (1994)
 Iron Maiden – Best of the B'Sides (2002)
 James – Ultra (2001)
 Jars of Clay – The White Elephant Sessions (1999)
 The Jesus and Mary Chain – Barbed Wire Kisses (1988)
 The Jesus and Mary Chain – The Sound of Speed (1993)
 The Jesus and Mary Chain – Hate Rock 'N' Roll (1995)
 President Of Blasia – The Election (2022)
 Judas Priest – Priest, Live and Rare (1998)
 Elton John – Rare Masters (1992)
 Kate Bush – This Woman's Work: Anthology 1978–1990 (1990)
 Kent – B-sidor 95–00 (2000)
 The Killers – Sawdust (2007)
 The Kooks – All over town (2008) (Konk, after "Tick of time")
 Kydd – Anunnaki (2013)
 L'Arc-en-Ciel – The Best of L'Arc-en-Ciel C/W (2003)
 The Lawrence Arms – Cocktails & Dreams (2005)
 Less Than Jake – B is for B-Sides (2004)
 Mae – Destination: B-Sides (2004)
 Manic Street Preachers – Lipstick Traces (2003)
 Marillion – B'Sides Themselves (1988)
 Maroon 5 – The B-Side Collection (2007)
 Matthew Good Band – Lo-Fi B-Sides (1997)
 Maxïmo Park – Missing Songs (2005)
 Metallica – Garage Inc. (1998)
 The Mighty Mighty Bosstones – Medium Rare
 Moby – Rare: The Collected B-Sides 1989–1993 (1996)
 Moby – Play: The B Sides (2001)
 Moby – 18 B-Sides (2004) (most of the b-sides from album 18)
 Modest Mouse – Building Nothing Out of Something
 Modest Mouse – No One's First and You're Next
 Morning Musume – Morning Musume Zen Singles Coupling Collection
 Morphine – B-Sides and Otherwise (1997)
 Mr. Children – B-Side (2007)
 Mucc – Coupling Worst (2009)
 Mucc – Worst of MUCC (2007)
 Muse – Hullabaloo Soundtrack (2001)
Eminem – Music to Be Murdered By (2020)
 MxPx – Let It Happen
 MxPx – Let's Rock
 My Chemical Romance – Live and Rare (2007)
 My Chemical Romance – The Black Parade: The B-Sides (2009)
 The National – The Virginia EP (2008)
 Nena – Maxis & Mixes
 Nena – Einmal ist Keinmal
 Nick Cave and the Bad Seeds – B-Sides & Rarities (2005)
 Nick Cave and the Bad Seeds – B-Sides & Rarities Part II (2021)
 Nirvana – Incesticide (1992)
 Nirvana – With the Lights Out [Box set] (2004)
 NOFX – 45 or 46 Songs That Weren't Good Enough to Go on Our Other Records (2002)
 No Doubt – Everything in Time (2004)
 Oasis – The Masterplan (1998)
 Ocean Colour Scene – B-sides, Seasides and Freerides (1997)
 Orchestral Manoeuvres in the Dark – Navigation: The OMD B-Sides (2001)
 Over the Rhine – Besides (1997)
 Paramore – The Summer Tic (2006)
 Pearl Jam – Lost Dogs (2003)
 Pet Shop Boys – Alternative (1995)
 Pet Shop Boys – Format (2012)
 Pierrot – Dictators Circus -a deformed BUD- (2005)
 The Pillows – Another morning, Another pillows (2002)
 Pink Floyd – Relics (1971; 1996)  
 Pixies – Complete 'B' Sides (2001)
 Porcupine Tree – Recordings (2001)
 Prince – The Hits/The B-Sides (1993)
 Queens Of The Stone Age – The Definitive Collection Of B-Sides & Rarities (2007)
 Radiohead - Airbag/How Am I Driving? (1998)
 Radiohead – In Rainbows (Disk 2) (2007)
 Rancid – B Sides and C Sides (2008)
 Relient K – The Bird and the Bee Sides (2008)
 R.E.M. – Dead Letter Office (1987)
 R.E.M. – In Time: The Best of R.E.M. 1988–2003, Disc 2: Rarities and B-Sides (2003)
 Red Hot Chili Peppers – I'm With You Sessions (2012–2013) - I'm Beside You (2013)
 Rise Against – Long Forgotten Songs: B-Sides & Covers (2000–2013) (2013)
 Roxette – Rarities (1995)
 Rumer - B Sides and Rarities (2015)
 Sakanaction - Tsuki no Namigata: Coupling & Unreleased Works (2015)
 Sarah McLachlan – Rarities, B-Sides and Other Stuff (1996) and Rarities, B-Sides and Other Stuff Volume 2 (2008)
 Scandal - Encore Show (2013)
 Scaterd Few – Out of the Attic (1994)
 Shai Hulud – A Comprehensive Retrospective: Or How I Learned To Stop Worrying and Release Bad and Useless Recordings (1996)
 Shihad – B-Sides (1996)
 Shonen Knife – The Birds & the B-Sides (1996)
 Siouxsie and the Banshees – Downside Up (2004)
 Sister Hazel – BAM! Volume 1 (2007)
 Skid Row – B-Side Ourselves (1992)
 Skinny Puppy – B-Sides Collect (1999)
 Sky Ferreira - Night Time, My Time: B-Sides Part 1 (2013)
 The Smashing Pumpkins – Pisces Iscariot (1994)
 The Smashing Pumpkins – Judas O (2001) (limited edition bonus CD to Rotten Apples; a collection of B-sides meant to "sequel" Pisces Iscariot)
 The Smashing Pumpkins – Rarities and B-Sides (2005)
 Something for Kate – Phantom Limbs – Selected B Sides (2004)
 Sonic Youth – The Destroyed Room: B-sides and Rarities
 The Stone Roses - The Complete Stone Roses (1995)
 Strangelove – One Up: The B-Sides (2008)
 Suede – Sci-Fi Lullabies (1997)
 Superfly - Coupling Songs: 'Side B' (2015)
 Swollen Members – Monsters In The Closet (2002)
 System of a Down – B-Sides (2002)
 System of a Down – Steal This Album! (2002) (not a B-sides collection, but rather a collection of so-called outtakes released because some of the songs they recorded after Toxicity leaked to the internet)
 Talk Talk – Asides Besides (1997)
 Tears for Fears – Saturnine Martial & Lunatic (1996)
 They Might Be Giants – Miscellaneous T (1991)
 Thom Yorke – Spitting Feathers
 U2 – Medium, Rare & Remastered (2009)
 Ultravox – Rare, Vol. 1
 Ultravox – Rare, Vol. 2
 The Verve – No Come Down (1994)
 Toad the Wet Sprocket – In Light Syrup (1995)
 Ween – Shinola, Vol. 1 (2005)
 Weezer – B-Sides And Rarities (1994) (which is actually a widespread bootleg, not an official album)
 We Are Scientists – Crap Attack (2006)
 The Who – Who's Missing (1985)
 XTC – Beeswax: Some B-Sides 1977–1982 (1982)
 Yui – My Short Stories (2008)
 Zone – ura E~Complete B side Melodies~ (2006)
× Arctic Monkeys-2013 (2013)

Albums featuring extensive B-sides
 Tori Amos – A Piano: The Collection (2006)
 Ash – Intergalactic Sonic 7s (incl Bonus CD Cosmic Debris) (2002)
 Aslan – The Platinum Collection (2005)
 The Beatles - Past Masters (1988)
 The Beautiful South – Carry on up the Charts (Limited Edition) (1994)
 Belle and Sebastian – Push Barman to Open Old Wounds (2005)
 Björk – Family Tree (box set) (2002)
 Blur – Bustin' + Dronin' (1998)
 Buckcherry – Buckcherry (Special Edition) (2006)
 Catherine Wheel – Like Cats and Dogs (1996)
 The Clash – Super Black Market Clash (released 1993)
 Elvis Costello and the Attractions – Taking Liberties (1980), also Ten Bloody Marys & Ten How's Your Fathers (similar UK release)
 Cowboy Junkies – Rarities, B-Sides and Slow, Sad Waltzes (1999)
 The Fiery Furnaces – EP (2005)
 The Frank and Walters – Souvenirs (2005)
 Genesis – Genesis Archive 2: 1976–1992 (2000)
 Green Day – Shenanigans (2002)
 The Hollies - The Other Side Of The Hollies (1978). One track, 'I've Got A Way Of My Own' had previously appeared on a Hollies official, studio-album release.
 The Jam – Extras (1993)
 Jawbreaker - Etc. (2002)
 Billy Joel – My Lives (2005)
 Korn – See You on the Other Side (Deluxe Edition) (2005)
 Avril Lavigne – B-Sides (2002)
 10,000 Maniacs – Campfire Songs: The Popular, Obscure and Unknown Recordings (2004)
 Mansun – Kleptomania (2004)
 Marillion – B'Sides Themselves (1988)
 Sarah McLachlan – Rarities, B-Sides and Other Stuff (1996)
 Megadeth – The reissues of their first eight albums. (2006)
 Natalie Merchant – Retrospective: 1995–2005 (2005)
 Morrissey – Bona Drag (1990)
 Morrissey – World of Morrissey (1995)
 Morrissey – My Early Burglary Years (1998)
 Morrissey – You Are the Quarry: Deluxe Edition (2004)
 New Order – Substance (1987)
 Nine Inch Nails – The Downward Spiral: Deluxe Edition (2004)
 Tom Petty and the Heartbreakers – Playback (1995)
 Pavement – Slanted and Enchanted: Luxe & Reduxe (2002)
 Pavement – Crooked Rain, Crooked Rain: LA's Desert Origins (2004)
 Pavement – Wowee Zowee: Sordid Sentinels Edition (2006)
 Pavement – Brighten the Corners: Nicene Creedence Edition (2008)
 Prince – The Hits/The B-Sides (1993)
 Radiohead - OK Computer OKNOTOK 1997 2017 (2017)
 R.E.M. – In Time: The Best of R.E.M. 1988–2003 (2003), a bonus CD was included with the band's best of album that included B-Sides & other rare tracks.
 The Replacements – All for Nothing / Nothing for All (1997)
 Slipknot – Slipknot (Digipak) (2000)
 The Shadows – The Complete Singles As and Bs 1959–1979 (4-CD set)
 The Smiths – Hatful of Hollow (1984)
 The Smiths – The World Won't Listen (1987)
 The Smiths – Louder Than Bombs (1987)
 Static-X – Beneath... Between... Beyond... (2004)
 Steps – The Last Dance (2002)
 The Stone Roses - Turns into Stone (1992)
 Super Furry Animals – Out Spaced (1998)
 KT Tunstall – KT Tunstall's Acoustic Extravaganza (2006)
 U2 – The Best of 1980–1990: Limited Edition (1998)
 U2 – The Best of 1990–2000: Limited Edition (2002)
 Ween – The Brown Sides (2008; 2014)
 Weezer – Weezer Deluxe Edition
 XTC – Rag and Bone Buffet: Rare Cuts and Leftovers (1990)

See also
 B-Sides, several albums
 B-Sides and Rarities, several albums
 Lists of albums

References

B-Side Compilations